Our Lady of Lourdes Catholic School is a private primary school serving pre-kindergarten through 8th grade located in Bethesda, Maryland. The school is affiliated with Our Lady of Lourdes parish and is a part of the Roman Catholic Archdiocese of Washington school system.

History
Our Lady of Lourdes was founded in 1941 when the parish undertook a building drive which included a school building and a convent. The school's gymnasium served as the church until the present church structure was completed in 1951. The school was expanded in 1951 by the addition of six classrooms on the north end of the building. The gymnasium was renovated in 2001 and the turf field was installed in 2007.

Notable alumni
Martin O'Malley, governor of Maryland
Taylor Momsen, she plays Jenny Humphrey on Gossip Girl and she is the vocalist of the band The Pretty Reckless.

References

External links
Our Lady of Lourdes Catholic School

Schools in Bethesda, Maryland
Educational institutions established in 1941
Catholic elementary schools in the United States
Catholic schools in Maryland
1941 establishments in Maryland